Sugar 'n' Spice is a 1962 album by Peggy Lee. The orchestra was conducted by Benny Carter.

Track listing
"Ain't That Love" (Ray Charles) – 1:59
"The Best is Yet to Come" (Cy Coleman, Carolyn Leigh) – 3:19
"I Believe in You" from the Broadway Production How to Succeed in Business Without Really Trying (Frank Loesser) – 2:45
"Embrasse-Moi" (Peggy Lee, D'Aime Barelli) – 3:23
"See See Rider" (Ma Rainey) – 2:34
"Teach Me Tonight" (Sammy Cahn, Gene De Paul) – 2:22
"When the Sun Comes Out" (Harold Arlen, Ted Koehler) – 2:46
"Tell All the World About You" (Ray Charles) – 2:30
"I Don't Wanna Leave You Now" (Lee, Richard Hazard, Jeanne Taylor) – 2:21
"The Sweetest Sounds" from the Broadway Production No Strongs (Richard Rodgers) – 1:50
"I've Got the World on a String" (Harold Arlen, Ted Koehler) – 2:20
"Big Bad Bill (Is Sweet William Now)" (Milton Ager, Jack Yellen) – 2:37
bonus tracks added to re-issue:
"I'll Be Around" (Alec Wilder) – 2:44
"Loads of Love" (Richard Rodgers) – 2:21
"Amazing" (Norman Gimbel, Emil Stern) – 2:35

References

Capitol Records ST-1772

1962 albums
Capitol Records albums
Peggy Lee albums
Albums conducted by Benny Carter
Albums produced by Milt Gabler